The first season of the reality television series Love & Hip Hop: Atlanta aired on VH1 from June 18, 2012, until September 3, 2012. The show was primarily filmed in Atlanta, Georgia. It was executively produced by Mona Scott-Young for Monami Entertainment, Toby Barraud and Stefan Springman for NFGTV, and Shelly Tatro, Brad Abramson, Danielle Gelfand and Jeff Olde for VH1. Carlos King served as co-executive producer.

The series chronicles the lives of several women and men in the Atlanta area, involved in hip hop music. It consists of 12 episodes, including a two-part reunion special hosted by Mona Scott Young.

Production
On May 15, 2012, VH1 announced Love & Hip Hop: Atlanta, the Atlanta-based spin-off of Love & Hip Hop, would make its series premiere on June 18, 2012. A 5-minute long "super-trailer" was released on June 7, 2012. The series would star Stevie J's girlfriend Mimi Faust, Lil Scrappy's girlfriend Erica Dixon,   Rasheeda, K. Michelle and aspiring performers Karlie Redd and Joseline Hernandez, with Stevie J, Lil Scrappy, his mother Momma Dee, Mimi's best friend Ariane Davis, Rasheeda's husband Kirk Frost, Benzino and Flavor of Love'''s Shay Johnson as supporting cast members.

On December 16, 2012, VH1 aired Dirty Little Secrets'', a special featuring unseen footage, deleted scenes and interviews with the show's cast and producers. The special garnered 1.22 million viewers.

The season was released on DVD in region 1 on October 19, 2012.

Synopsis

Mimi suspects her long time boyfriend, Grammy Award-winning singer and songwriter Stevie J, of cheating after he spends too many late nights at the studio with his new artist, Joseline. Erica is struggling to find solid ground with her daughter's father, rapper Lil Scrappy, while dealing with Scrappy's overbearing mother, Momma Dee, a former pimp, and her own mother, Mingnon, a recovering crack cocaine addict who has recently re-entered her life. Karlie is looking for her big break as an artist while K. Michelle is trying to get her career back on track after an abusive relationship with a music executive. Rasheeda is frustrated with her status as an underground rapper and is contemplating firing her husband Kirk as her manager.

Reception
After its premiere, the show's audience grew substantially over the season. Its finale garnered 5.5 million people overall, cementing its status as the highest rated show in primetime on cable among adults 18–49.

Cast

Starring

 Joseline Hernandez (12 episodes)
 Erica Dixon (12 episodes)
 Rasheeda (12 episodes)
 K. Michelle (11 episodes)
 Karlie Redd (11 episodes)
 Mimi Faust (12 episodes)

Also starring

 Stevie J (12 episodes)
 Lil Scrappy (12 episodes)
 Ariane Davis (9 episodes)
 Momma Dee (8 episodes)
 Kirk Frost (10 episodes)
 Shay Johnson (7 episodes)
 Benzino (10 episodes)

Erica's mother Mingnon Dixon and Dr. Jeff appears as guest stars in several episodes. The show also features appearances from notable figures within the hip hop industry and Atlanta's social scene, including J. Que,  Bryan-Michael Cox, Deb Antney, Joseline's producer Fly Dantoni, Kenny Burns, Stevie Baggs, Vincent Herbert, Stevie and Mimi's daughter Eva Jordan, Roscoe Dash and Stevie's artist Che Mack. Funkmaster Flex and Funky Dineva appear at the reunion special.

Episodes

Webisodes

Bonus scenes
Deleted and extended scenes from the season's episodes were released weekly as bonus content on VH1's official website, as well as the season's DVD release.

One scene features Kalenna Harper, who would join the cast in a larger role in season three. Another scene features a cameo from Kelsie Frost, who would join the cast in a larger role in season five. Dondria and Frank Walker also appear.

Music
Several cast members had their music featured on the show and released singles to coincide with the airing of the episodes.

References

External links

2012 American television seasons
Love & Hip Hop